Tassos Mantzavinos (Greek: Τάσος Μαντζαβίνος; born March 2, 1958) is a Greek painter who graduated from the Athens School of Fine Arts. His work has been exhibited in many museums and galleries in Greece and abroad and he has also worked on various book illustrations.

Life
Tassos Mantzavinos was born in Athens on 2 March 1958. His first painting instructors were Manos Sofianos and Mimis Kontos. He studied painting at the Athens School of Fine Arts in 1979 and graduated with distinction in 1984. Among his teachers was Yiannis Moralis. In 1984 he held his first solo exhibition in Athens at Gallery 7. Tassos Mantzavinos continued with numerous solo exhibitions in Greece and participated in group exhibitions in Greece and abroad. He also participated in the 2nd and 3rd Biennale of Young Artists from Europe and the Mediterranean in Thessaloniki and Barcelona, as well as the 16th Biennale of Alexandria in 1987.  Along with his artistic career, Tassos Mantzavinos taught drawing at the Vakalo Art & Design College in Athens and worked on various book illustrations.

Work
Since his early period, the key elements of his painting were the anti-naturalistic, expressionistic intensity in the drawing style of his forms and an existential exploration through particular themes, but also through the act of painting itself. After the mid 1990s, the largest part of his work features narrative elements, referring to personal memories, experiences and dreams, clearly autobiographical, or strongly symbolic folk tales and traditions. Tassos Mantzavinos’ themes sometimes acquire a surrealistic dimension, as they are presented in unexpected combinations. The frequent presence of the artist's figure in the paintings, and his fascination with certain thematic motifs  reveal a deep, empathetic link between the artist and his work. His three-dimensional wooden constructions, one of his latest artistic endeavours, function as an extension of his painting, enhancing its communicative immediacy.

Solo exhibitions
 2013 Tassos Mantzavinos-Kostas Papanikolaou, Citronne Gallery, Poros, Greece
 2012 Tassos Mantzavinos, Theorema Art Gallery, Brussels, Belgium
 2012 “For my strength is made perfect in weakness”, Benaki Museum, Greece
 2012 Skoufa Gallery, Athens, Greece
 2010 Chess, K-Art Gallery, Athens, Greece
 2010 Zoumboulaki Gallery, Athens, Greece
 2010 Angelo and Lito Katakouzenos Foundation, Athens, organised by the Hellenic Folklore Research Centre of the Academy of Athens, Athens, Greece
 2008 Galerie Aliquando, Paris, France
 2008 TinT Gallery, Thessaloniki, Greece
 2008 Ionos Gallery, Karditsa, Greece
 2005 Nees Morfes Gallery, Athens, Greece
 2004 TinT Gallery, Thessaloniki, Greece
 2003 Ariadne Gallery, Heracleion, Crete, Greece
 2003 V. Mylonogiannis Gallery, Chania, Crete, Greece
 2003 Nees Morfes Gallery, Athens, Greece
 2002 TinT Gallery, Thessaloniki, Greece
 2000 Nees Morfes Gallery, Athens, Greece
 1999 Terracotta Gallery, Thessaloniki, Greece
 1997 Nees Morfes Gallery, Athens, Greece
 1996 Terracotta Gallery, Thessaloniki, Greece
 1996 Anemos Gallery, Athens, Greece
 1994 Terracotta Gallery, Thessaloniki, Greece
 1994 Nees Morfes Gallery, Athens, Greece
 1993 Gallery 24, Athens, Greece
 1991 Medusa Art Gallery, Athens, Greece
 1989 Medusa Art Gallery, Athens, Greece
 1987 Medusa Art Gallery, Athens, Greece
 1985 Gallery 7, Athens, Greece
 1984 Gallery 7, Athens, Greece

Group exhibitions 
2013 The 80s Generation - Contemporary Greek Painting from the Sotiris Felios Collection, National Gallery-Alexander Soutzos Museum, Sparta
2013 Somatographies—Contemporary Greek Painting from the Sotiris Felios Collection, National Gallery-Alexander Soutzos Museum, Nafplion 
2013 Offerings, Art Space 24, Athens, Greece
2012 Ellenico Plurale- Dipinti dalla Collezione Sotiris Fellios, Complesso del Vittoriano, Rome, Italy
2012 Between Reality and Fantasy, Giorgio de Chirico Art Center, Volos, Greece
2010 Erysichthon: A contemporary reading of the myth, Cultural Centre Kanellopoulos, Elefsina, Greece
2010 Naked Truth, Frissiras Museum, Athens, Greece
2010 Offerings of Europe: Christian votive practices in the East and the West, Muzeum Kresów, Lubaczomie, Poland
2010 A world of votive offerings, organized by the Hellenic Folklore Research Centre of the Academy of Athens, Hellenic American Union, Athens, Greece
2010 Contemporary Greek Painting from the Sotiris Felios Collection, Sismanoglio Megaro, Istanbul, Turkey
2009 Human and Divine, French Embassy in Athens, a collaboration of the National Museum of European and Mediterranean Civilization of France and the Hellenic Folklore Research Centre of the Academy of Athens, Greece
2009 Nees Morfes, 50 years later, Benaki Museum, Athens, Greece
2009 The Perspective of Time. Pictorial Histories: Paintings from the Sotiris Felios Collection, Benaki Museum, Athens, Greece
2009 Oli-vie-r, organized by the Hellenic Folklore Research Centre of the Academy of Athens, National School of the Agriculture of Meknes, Morocco
2008 Rural Heritage and Collective Identity, Muzeum Kresów, Lubaczowie, Poland
2008 The Sea. Four Painters, Citronne Gallety, Poros, Greece
2008 Christmas with Papadiamantis, Art Space 24, Athens, Greece
2007 Tamata and Thavmata. Organized by the 21st Ephorate of Byzantine Antiquities and the National Museum for European and Mediterranean Culture of France, Corfu, Greece
2007 Self Portrait of an Other. Giullio Caimi(1897-1982), Art Space 24, Athens, Greece
2007 Birthplace. Apha Trust 20 years, Benaki Museum, Athens, Greece
2006 Humanography, works from the Christos Christofis Collection, Thracian Art and Tradition Foundation, Xanthi, Greece
2006 Summer, an Encounter, Art Space 24, Athens, Greece
2006 Disguises: Femininity, Manliness and Other Certainties, State Museum of Contemporary Art, Thessaloniki, Greece 
2006 Once upon a Time there was Penelope Delta..., Athens College, Athens, Greece 
2006 Projections of Shadows and Colour. Tassos Missouras, Tassos Mantzavinos, Michalis Μadenis, from the Christos Christofis Collection, French Institute, Athens, Greece
2004 In praise of the Olive Tree, Academy of Athens, Athens, Greece
2004 Art Athina 11, Athens, Greece (Nees Morfes Gallery)
2004 City of Games, Technopolis of the Municipality of Athens, Greece 
2004 Frontiersmen of Europe, Byzantine Museum, Athens, Greece, in collaboration with the Academy of Athens 
2002 Athens, Single Use Gazes, A. Antonopoulou Art, Athens, Greece
2002 Greek Painters. The Christos Christofis Collection, Triantifylli Residence, Athens, Greece
2002 A Visual Journey, Frissiras Museum, Athens, Greece
2002 Me, Myself, Rethymnon Centre of Contemporary Art, Rethymnon, Crete, Greece 
2002 450+1. The Permanent Collection, Macedonian Museum of Contemporary Art, Thessaloniki, Greece
2002 Designing of the poster for the 44th Thessaloniki Festival “New Horizons”, Thessaloniki, Greece
2000 Oinousses 2000. Contemporary Greek Painting: The Christos Christofis Collection, Marine Highschool, Oinousses, Greece
2000 Art Athina 8, Athens, Greece (with Nees Morfes Gallery)
1999 Approaches to Greekness. The 80s and 90s Generations, Municipal Gallery, Athens, Greece and Greek Cultural Home, Stockholm, Dalarna Museum, Falun, Sweden, Château de Vianden, Luxemburg
1999 Forty, Nees Morfes Gallery, Athens, Greece 
1998 Greek Landscape Painting in the 19th-20th Centuries, National Gallery & Alexandros Soutzos Museum, Athens, Greece 
1998 Art Athina 6, Athens, Greece (Terracotta Gallery)
1998 Original Replica, Nees Morfes Gallery, Athens, Greece 
1998 Designing of the poster and invitation for the IX European Signal Processing Conference, organised by the Athens University – Computer Technology Institute, Greece
1997 Physiognomy of an Industrial Landscape, BIS Factory, Athens, Greece 
1997 Comments and References, Pierides Museum, Glyfada, Greece
1997 42ème Salon de Montrouge, Paris, France
1996 Riparte 3, Rome, Italy
1996 Group Show, Selini Gallery, Kifissia, Greece
1994 Art Athina 2, Athens, Greece (Terracotta Gallery)
1994 The Loss of Form in Space, Nees Morfes Gallery, Athens, Greece
1991 Contemporary Greek Painting. Vlassis Frissiras Collection, Pierides Museum, Glyfada, Athens, Greece
1989 17+1, Medusa Art Gallery, Athens, Greece
1988 Encounters – Pinpointing – Juxtapositions, Athens Municipal Gallery, Greece 
1987 3rd European Mediterranean Biennale for Young Artists, Barcelona, Spain
1987 16th Biennale of Alexandria, Egypt
1986 2nd European Mediterranean Biennale for Young Artists, Thessaloniki, Greece

References
http://dp.iset.gr/en/artist/view.html?id=1288&tab=main
http://www.felioscollection.gr/en/artist/mantzavinos-tasos

Bibliography
Begleris, F. Tassos Mantzavinos: For my strength is made perfect in weakness. Athens: Patakis Publications, 2012. Print. 

1958 births
Living people
Greek painters
Artists from Athens